Once More is the third album led by American jazz drummer Billy Higgins recorded in 1980 and released on the Italian Red label.

Reception
Ken Dryden of AllMusic recommends the album.

Track listing
  "Plexus" (Cedar Walton) - 7:28
 "Lover Man" (Jimmy Davis, Ram Ramirez, Jimmy Sherman) - 7:33
 "Sabiá" (Antonio Carlos Jobim) - 4:26
 "Amazon" (Bob Berg) - 6:15
 "Estaté" (Bruno Martino) - 7:07
 "Horizons" (Manfred Schoof) - 8:16

Personnel
Billy Higgins - drums
Bob Berg - tenor saxophone
Cedar Walton - piano
Tony Dumas - bass

References 

Red Records albums
Billy Higgins albums
1980 albums